The bight slider (Lerista arenicola)  is a species of skink found in South Australia and Western Australia.

References

Lerista
Reptiles described in 1971
Taxa named by Glen Milton Storr
Hampton bioregion